Galima Akhmetkareevna Shugurova (Tatar: Галима Әхмәтгәрәй кызы Шөгурова; born 8 November 1953 in Omsk) is a retired rhythmic gymnast who competed for the Soviet Union. She is the 1973 World All-around champion and two time (1969, 1977) World All-around silver medalist. She is the first All-around winner of the European Championships.

Personal life 
Shugurova was born to a Siberian Tatar family in the city of Omsk, in western Siberia. She studied history at the Omsk Pedagogical Institute.
Shugurova graduated from the Omsk Institute of Physical Training in 1975.

Career 
Shugurova was introduced to rhythmic gymnastics when she was eight years old. Initially, she was more attracted to figure skating and choreography classes.

Shugurova debuted on the world stage as a 15-year-old in Varna, Bulgaria at the 1969 World Championships, winning gold medals in rope and ball. At 15, she made her first appearance at the USSR championships, placing second in the all-around. The following year she won a bronze medal in the USSR Cup competition and was also successful in international competitions in the former Yugoslavia, where the journalists voted her the "most engaging" gymnast.

At the 1973 World Championships in Rotterdam, Netherlands, Shurugova shared the world crown in the all-around with Bulgarian Maria Gigova. She also won gold medals in ribbon, ball and clubs. Both of the ribbon routines at this Championship were to the same music – a piece from Georges Bizet's ballet "Carmen".

Shurugova is considered as one of the great gymnasts that revolutionized the sport of rhythmic gymnastics in the Soviet Union. She was the third Soviet rhythmic gymnast to become world all-around champion—after Ludmila Savinkova (1963) and Elena Karpuchina (1967)—and the first ever European all-around champion in 1978.

Influence 

Shugurova helped create a new rhythmic gymnastics element called the "Shugurova" which consists of tipping or spinning a rolling hoop with the feet during a leap.

Achievements 

 First ever winner of the European Championships in 1978.

References

External links
 
 
 

1953 births
Living people
Russian rhythmic gymnasts
Sportspeople from Omsk
Soviet rhythmic gymnasts
Siberian Tatar people
Tatar sportspeople
Medalists at the Rhythmic Gymnastics World Championships